The year 708 BC was a year of the pre-Julian Roman calendar. In the Roman Empire, it was known as year 46 Ab urbe condita . The denomination 708 BC for this year has been used since the early medieval period, when the Anno Domini calendar era became the prevalent method in Europe for naming years.

Events

 Traditional founding date of the city of Croton (modern Crotone), Italy.

Births
 Chuzi I, duke of Qin

Deaths

References

700s BC